Prionapteryx scitulellus is a moth in the family Crambidae described by Francis Walker in 1866. It is found in India, Sri Lanka and Kenya.

Description
The wingspan is about 16 mm in the male and 24 mm in the female. Forewings with veins 4 and 5 stalked. It is a brownish-ochreous moth. Head, thorax, and abdomen tinged with fuscous. Forewings with diffused fuscous on basal inner area and defining the inner side of the oblique ochreous medial band, where the area between which and the oblique submarginal band is fuscous except on the costal area. A black discocelular spot. The submarginal band dentate inwards below costa. The marginal area fuscous, with a series of black specks. Hindwings pale fuscous or whitish.

References

Ancylolomiini
Moths described in 1866